Club Deportivo Chaco Petrolero is a Bolivian football club based in La Paz. Founded on 20 October 1944, it currently plays in Bolivian Football Regional Leagues, holding home games at Estadio Hernando Siles, with a 42,000-seat capacity.

History
The club was founded in 1944 as Club Deportivo Chaco Petrolero, and participated in the 1971 and 1972 Copa Libertadores.

Honours

National
Copa Simón Bolivar (Primera División): 1970

Performance in CONMEBOL competitions
Copa Libertadores: 2 appearances
1971 – First Round
1972 – First Round

References

Association football clubs established in 1944
Deportivo Municipal
Football clubs in La Paz
1944 establishments in Bolivia